Jongsma is a surname. Notable people with the surname include:

Anton Jongsma (born 1983), Dutch Antillean footballer
Eline Jongsma, Dutch film director and artist
Wik Jongsma (1943–2008), Dutch film actor

Dutch-language surnames